Lassi is a regional name for buttermilk, the traditional dahi (yogurt)–based drink, consumed in the South Asian region. Lassi is a blend of yogurt, water, spices, and sometimes fruit. Salty lassi is similar to doogh, while modern sweet lassi is like milkshake. Lassi may be infused with cannabis in the form of bhang.

Etymology 
Lassi is derived from the Sanskrit word Lasika meaning serous or saliva like.Alternatively, it is also spelled as Lāsī (Laasi). Lassi originated in Punjab.

Preparation 

Lassi is prepared by blending yogurt, water, and other spices. However, variations of lassi can be prepared in different ways. Cumin and cardamom are the most common spices added to lassi. Lassi is traditionally served in a clay cup known as kulhar. This Indian drink is consumed year around; however, it is most popular during the summer months.

Variations

Sweet lassi
Sweet lassi is a form of lassi flavoured with sugar, rosewater or lemon, strawberry or other fruit juices. Saffron lassis, which are particularly rich, are a specialty of Punjab, Rajasthan, Haryana and Gujarat in India and Sindh province of Pakistan. Makkhaniya lassi is simply lassi with lumps of butter in it. It is usually creamy like a milkshake.

Salted lassi

The traditional namkeen (or salty) form of lassi is more common in the Indian subcontinent. It is prepared by blending dahi (yogurt) with water with added salt. The resulting beverage is known as salted lassi.  In Pakistan, it is known as Namkeen Lassi, which is sometimes called Ayran by Pashtun and other Iranian and Dardic groups.

Bhang lassi
Bhang lassi is a cannabis-infused drink that contains bhang, a liquid derivative of cannabis, which has effects similar to other eaten forms of cannabis. It is legal in many parts of India and mainly sold during Holi, when pakoras containing bhang are also sometimes eaten. Uttar Pradesh is known to have licensed bhang shops, and in many places, one can buy bhang products and drink bhang lassis.

Cultural references
A 2008 print and television ad campaign for HSBC, written by Jeffree Benet of JWT Hong Kong, tells the tale of a Polish washing machine manufacturer's representative sent to India to discover why their sales are so high there.  On arriving, the representative investigates a lassi parlor, where he is warmly welcomed, and finds several washing machines being used to mix it.  The owner tells him he is able to "make ten times as much lassi as I used to!"

On his No Reservations television program, celebrity chef Anthony Bourdain visited a "government authorised" bhang shop in Jaisalmer Fort, Rajasthan. The proprietor offered him three varieties of bhang lassi: normally strong; super duper strong; and "full power, 24 hours, no toilet, no shower".

In 2013, Kshitij, the annual techno-management fest of IIT Kharagpur, launched a campaign to name the 'L' version of the mobile operating system Android, Lassi.

Gallery

See also

 Borhani
 Cacık
 Mattha
 Kumis
 Health shake
 Milkshake
 Smoothie
 List of yogurt-based dishes and beverages

References

Yogurt-based drinks
Fermented dairy products
Fermented drinks
Indian drinks
Pakistani drinks
Nepalese drinks
Sri Lankan drinks
Indian cuisine
Punjabi cuisine
Bengali cuisine
Bangladeshi drinks
Bangladeshi cuisine
Nepalese cuisine
Sri Lankan cuisine
Indian dairy products